The Deutsche Reitpony or German Riding Pony  is a very popular pony breed in Germany.  It is described as  a "miniature warmblood" with refined, horse-like characteristics that make it suitable as both a children's pony and as a mount for sport horse competition in Europe.  Originally bred in Germany and later throughout Western Europe, the breed is relatively new to North America.

Characteristics
More than most pony breeds, the German Riding Pony has a phenotype very similar to that of a full-sized horse. Only the head is pony-like, giving the appearance of having a pleasant manner and friendly disposition.

The German Riding Pony is bred to be handled by children and adolescents. It is suited for both dressage and jumping, with a way of going that is smooth and very horse-like.

History

The breeding of the Deutsche Reitpony began around 1965, by crossbreeding various English pony breeds, especially Welsh ponies, on Arabians, Anglo-Arabians and Thoroughbreds. The goal was to breed competition-quality ponies for children to ride in sport horse competitions, more easily controllable by children than the typical large Warmblood horses used by adults, while also keeping some Pony characteristics, including character, type and willingness to perform.

Initially, Thoroughbred and Arabian stallions were crossed on pony-sized Fjords and Haflingers. These cross-breeding attempts to produce a sport pony in one generation did not lead to the desired type. After British pony breeds, primarily Welsh ponies were imported and added to the bloodline, by 1975 a distinct German riding pony type developed. In the 1990s attempts were made to further improve the breed through the infusion of Trakehner, Hanoverian and Holsteiner blood, but this infusion of horse blood was unsuccessful: the pony type and qualities were often lost. Today's German Riding Pony breeders use specific bloodlines to reliably create German Riding Ponies that fulfill the goal of a pony type who competes with the athleticism of a small warmblood.

Today, the German Riding Pony breed has distinct bloodlines, and all ponies that will be used as breeding stock must pass rigorous inspections.  They are registered through Weser-Ems, a registry based in Vechta, Germany and partnered with the Oldenburg registry. Some infusion of Welsh pony and Arabian blood is still used.

Uses
Pony sport horse competitions or "tournaments" are popular in continental Europe, and ponies are shown by children and adolescents up to 16 years of age in the disciplines of dressage, show jumping, and eventing.  Major tournaments for pony riders include the German Youth Championships, the European Championships and the "Preis der Besten," a team competition, which will be in dressage, with the International Dressage tests of the FEI ridden, for preparatory examination, team and individual scoring. This competition is very popular and both contestants and coaches vie for spots on the respective participating teams.

The German Riding Pony breed is relatively new to the United States, with a few imports and a single breed registry authorized to conduct inspections for breeding stock.

See also
Pony
Sport horse
List of horse breeds

Horse breeds
Horse breeds originating in Germany